Band-e Shuy is a village in the Bamyan Province in north-central Afghanistan.

See also
Bamyan Province

References

External links
Satellite map at Maplandia.com

Populated places in Bamyan Province